Motif description is the term that has been used for a form of dance notation; however, the current preferred terminology is Motif Notation.  It is a subset and reconception of Labanotation sharing a common lexis. The main difference between the two forms is the type of information they record.

 Labanotation: Detailed description of movement so it may be reproduced exactly as it was performed or conceived.
 Motif description: Depicts the most important elements, the essential aspects of the movement sequence.

Motif description is often used as an alternative to Labanotation when information needs to be written down quickly.

See also
 Labanotation
 Rudolf Laban
 Dance score
 Dance Notation Bureau

External links
  Language of Dance Adaptation of Motif Description
 Moving About Motif Notation
 Motif Notation Online Course Motif Notation

Dance notation